Terryal Gene Humphrey (born August 4, 1949) is an American former professional baseball player. A catcher, he appeared in 415 games played over all or parts of nine Major League Baseball seasons for the Montreal Expos (1971–1974), Detroit Tigers (1975) and California Angels (1976–1979).

Humphrey was born in Chickasha, Oklahoma, but graduated from Carson High School in Southern California and attended Los Angeles City College and the University of Nebraska–Lincoln. He was selected in the 39th round of the 1969 Major League Baseball Draft by the Expos, a first-year expansion team; pitcher Balor Moore (the Expos' top pick) and outfielder Tony Scott (71st round) were also members of that draft class. When Humphrey was recalled from minor league baseball in September 1971, he became the second product (after Moore) of the Expo farm system to reach the major leagues.

He was traded along with Tom Walker from the Expos to the Tigers for Woodie Fryman on December 4, . He was dealt along with Leon Roberts, Gene Pentz and Mark Lemongello from the Tigers to the Houston Astros for Milt May, Dave Roberts and Jim Crawford one year later on December 6, 1975. 

His finest season came with the Angels in 1977 when he set career bests in games played (123), at bats (304), hits (69), doubles (11), home runs (2) and runs batted in (34). 

For his career, he batted .211 with 223 hits, six homers and 85 RBI.

References

External links

1949 births
Living people
American expatriate baseball players in Canada
Baseball players from Oklahoma
California Angels players
Detroit Tigers players
Florida Instructional League Expos players
Gulf Coast Expos players
Jacksonville Suns players
Major League Baseball catchers
Memphis Blues players
Montreal Expos players
Nebraska Cornhuskers baseball players
Peninsula Whips players
People from Chickasha, Oklahoma
Québec Carnavals players
Winnipeg Whips players
Carson High School (Carson, California) alumni